Oleng Panatidis (born 29 January 1971) is a Greek weightlifter. He competed in the men's heavyweight II event at the 1996 Summer Olympics.

References

1971 births
Living people
Greek male weightlifters
Olympic weightlifters of Greece
Weightlifters at the 1996 Summer Olympics
Place of birth missing (living people)
20th-century Greek people